The Rhode Island Democratic Party is the affiliate of the Democratic Party in the U.S. state of Rhode Island. Joseph McNamara is the chair of the party. The party has dominated politics in Rhode Island for the past five decades.

Democratic Party dominance in Rhode Island
For nearly five decades, Rhode Island has been one of the United States' most solidly Democratic states. Since 1928, it has voted for the Republican presidential candidate only four times (Dwight Eisenhower in 1952 and 1956, Richard Nixon in 1972 and Ronald Reagan in 1984) and has elected only two Republicans (former Governor John H. Chafee and his son, Lincoln Chafee, though the younger Chafee became a Democrat during his later governorship) to the U.S. Senate since 1934. Rhode Island sent no Republicans to the U.S. House of Representatives from 1940 until 1980, when one Republican and one Democrat were elected. In 1980, Rhode Island was one of only six states to be won by incumbent president Jimmy Carter. However, Republican Edward DiPrete was elected governor in 1984 and Ronald Reagan narrowly carried the state in the 1984 presidential election. In the 2000 presidential election, Democrat Al Gore won 61% of the popular vote in the state. 

An analysis of Gallup polling data shows the Democratic advantage over the Republican Party in Rhode Island voters plunged between 2008 and 2011. The Democratic advantage over the Republican Party in Rhode Island slid from 37 percentage points in 2008 to 16, according to Gallup. Rhode Island went from the most Democratic state in the country in 2008 to the 7th most Democratic in 2011.

Elected officials

U.S. Senate 
Democrats have controlled both of Rhode Island's seats in the U.S. Senate since 2006:

U.S. House of Representatives 
Out of the 2 seats Rhode Island is apportioned in the U.S. House of Representatives, both are held by Democrats:

Statewide officials
Democrats control all five of the elected statewide offices:
Governor: Dan McKee
Lieutenant Governor: Sabina Matos
Secretary of State: Gregg Amore
Attorney General: Peter Neronha
General Treasurer: James Diossa

State Legislature
President of the Senate: Dominick J. Ruggerio
Senate President Pro Tempore: Hanna Gallo
Senate Majority Leader: Michael McCaffrey
Senate Majority Whip: Maryellen Goodwin
Senate Deputy Majority Whip: Ana Quezada
Speaker of the House: Joe Shekarchi
House Speaker Pro Tempore: Brian Patrick Kennedy
House Majority Leader: Christopher Blazejewski
House Majority Whip: Katherine Kazarian

Party leadership and staff
The leadership of the Rhode Island Democratic Party, as of 2021, is as follows:

State committee officers
Chairman: Joseph McNamara
Vice Chairman: Grace Diaz

National Committee Persons
National Committeeman: Hon. Joseph R. Paolino, Jr.
National Committeewomen: Edna O'Neill Mattson

Staff
Senior Advisor and Chief Strategist: Kate Coyne-McCoy
Data Director: Jacob Jackson
Communications Coordinator: Victoria Gu
Comptroller: Susann Della Rosa

Previous election results

2020 general election

2018 general election

2016 general election

2014 general election

2008 general election

2004 general election

References

External links
Rhode Island Democratic Party
 

 
Democratic Party (United States) by state
Democratic Party